Foam Lake is a town in the province of Saskatchewan, Canada. It had a population of 1,123 in 2006.
It is located in a mixed agricultural area approximately 220 km south-east of Saskatoon on the Yellowhead Highway.

History 
Foam Lake was founded in 1882 by Joshua Milligan, an English fur trader. It was subsequently settled by Icelanders, Ukrainians, and various English-speaking nationalities. It was incorporated as a town in 1924.

The Foam Lake Museum (c. 1926) is a Municipal Heritage Property on the Canadian Register of Historic Places.
 
In the summer of 2006, two major fires destroyed a major part of Main Street in Foam Lake. The first fire destroyed three businesses and one home. These included the water fountain/Sears outlet/Backyard Studios, the doctor's office, and Dennis' Cafe, which was also the owner's home.
The second fire started in one of the three grain elevators, burning the first elevator to the ground and spreading to the second one. The volunteer fire department was able to put out the blaze with the help of two water bombers and volunteer fire departments from surrounding communities.

Demographics 

Sports and recreation 
Quill Lakes International Bird Area north-west of Foam Lake attracts bird watchers from all over the world. The Foam Lake Water Park features a 128 ft waterslide, hot tub, vortex and beach entry and is the summer hub of the community. Foam Lake's Annual Veselka Ukrainian Heritage Festival occurs each year and celebrates Ukrainian culture through food, music, art, and entertainment.

Foam Lake Flyers 
The Foam Lake Flyers of the amateur senior men's Long Lake Hockey League play at the Foam Lake Recreation Centre. They have been in existence since the 1940s. Many notable players and coaches have been a part of this team. Frank "Buzz" Boll coached the team for a few years in the late 1940s. He was a former National Hockey League player. Former Flyers also include Hockey Hall of Fame honoured member Bernie Federko, Canadian Olympian Ted Hargreaves, and many former junior stars including the Washington Capitals draft pick Jeff Lucky.

Education 
Foam Lake Elementary School and Foam Lake Composite High School are in the Horizon School Division No. 205. The high school's football team is called the Foam Lake Panthers.

Notable people 
Bernie Federko, professional ice hockey player.
Pat Elynuik, professional ice hockey player. 
Dennis Polonich, professional ice hockey player.
Tania Miller, youngest and first female conductor of a major Canadian Symphony Orchestra.

See also 
List of towns in Saskatchewan
List of communities in Saskatchewan
St. John the Evangelist Anglican Church (Foam Lake)

References 

Foam Lake No. 276, Saskatchewan
Towns in Saskatchewan
Icelandic settlements in Saskatchewan
Populated places established in 1882
1882 establishments in Canada
Division No. 10, Saskatchewan